Nonafluoro-tert-butyl alcohol (IUPAC name: 1,1,1,3,3,3-hexafluoro-2-(trifluoromethyl)propan-2-ol) is a fluoroalcohol.  It is the perfluorinated analog of tert-butyl alcohol.  Notably, as a consequence of its electron withdrawing fluorine substituents, it is very acidic for an alcohol, with a pKa value of 5.4, similar to that of a carboxylic acid.  As another consequence of being a perfluorinated compound, it is also one of the lowest boiling alcohols, with a boiling point lower than that of methanol.

Synthesis
It is prepared by addition of trichloromethyllithium to hexafluoroacetone, followed by halogen exchange with antimony pentafluoride. The aluminate derived from its alkoxide anion, tetrakis[1,1,1,3,3,3-hexafluoro-2-(trifluoromethyl)propan-2-oxy]aluminate(1–), {Al[(CF3)3CO]4}– is used as a weakly coordinating anion.

See also 
 2,2,2-Trifluoroethanol
 1,1,1,3,3,3-Hexafluoro-2-propanol
 Hexafluoroacetone

References

Tertiary alcohols
Trifluoromethyl compounds